Indumati Bhattacharya (2 July 1918 – 20 April 1990) was an Indian politician. She was elected to the Lok Sabha, the lower house of the Parliament of India for Hooghly, West Bengal in 1984 as a member of the Indian National Congress. Bhattacharya died in Chandernagar, West Bengal in April 1990 at the age of 71.

References

External links
  Official Biographical Sketch in Lok Sabha Website

1918 births
1990 deaths
India MPs 1984–1989
Indian National Congress politicians
People from Hooghly district